Zosēni Parish is an administrative unit of Cēsis Municipality in the Vidzeme region of Latvia (Prior to the 2009 it was part of the former Cēsis District).

Towns, villages and settlements of Zosēni parish 

Parishes of Latvia
Cēsis Municipality
Vidzeme